General elections were held in Uruguay on 31 October 1999, alongside a double referendum, with a second round of the presidential election on 28 November. The elections were the first in Uruguay since World War I that were not dominated by the Colorado Party and the National Party. The Broad Front had begun gaining popularity in 1994, and had become a key player in Uruguayan politics by 1999.

The Broad Front–Progressive Encounter alliance became the largest faction in the General Assembly, winning the most seats in both the Senate and the Chamber of Deputies. In the presidential elections, Tabaré Vázquez of the Broad Front received the most votes in the first round, but was defeated by Jorge Batlle of the Colorado Party in the second round. The National Party suffered the worst showing in its history, falling to third place in both chambers behind the Broad Front and Colorados. In the second round, Batlle formed an alliance with the National Party; according to The New York Times, the traditional parties' decision to put aside their rivalry of over a century and a half helped Batlle win the presidency on his fifth attempt.

Electoral system
Changes to the electoral law prior to the elections allowed third parties like the Broad Front a wider opportunity for participation. Parties were now required to hold primaries on the same day in April to elect a single presidential candidate; previously several candidates from a single party had been able to run for the presidency. The reforms also introduced the two-round system for the presidential election, with a candidate now required to receive over 50% of the vote to be elected in the first round, or face a run-off against the second-place candidate. Although the double simultaneous vote method (in which voters cast a single vote for the party of their choice for the Presidency, Senate and Chamber of Representatives) was retained, it prevented parties from submitting different lists.

The 30 members of the Senate were elected by proportional representation in a single nationwide constituency, whilst the 99 members of the Chamber of Representatives were elected by proportional representation in 19 multi-member constituencies based on the departments. Seats were allocated using the highest averages method.

Campaign
The requirement to choose a single presidential candidate created tension in some parties. The National Party chose Luis Alberto Lacalle, who had been president from 1990 to 1995. The Colorado Party primaries were won by Jorge Batlle, whilst the Broad Front selected Tabaré Vázquez.

The Colorado Party spent the most on the campaign, spending the equivalent of US$11.1m ($3.1m in the primaries and $8m in the main election). The Broad Front spend $8m ($670,000 during the primaries and $7.4m during the main campaign) and the National Party $7m ($2m in the primaries and $5m during the main election). Other parties spent $500,000 during both stages of the elections.

Results

Distribution by department

References

Uruguay
Elections in Uruguay
General
Uruguay
Uruguay
Jorge Batlle